Trachysma antarctica is a species of sea snail, a marine gastropod mollusc in the family Pendromidae.

Description

Distribution

References

Pendromidae
Gastropods described in 1996